The Pine Creek Park Bridge, also known as the Mill Hill Road Bridge, is a Pratt pony truss bridge in Fairfield, Connecticut. Built in 1872, it was listed on the National Register of Historic Places in 1992. It is significant as a rare example of an early iron bridge, from an era when bridge designs were changing and unsettled. It was produced by the Keystone Bridge Company of Pittsburgh, Pennsylvania, and is one of few surviving ones made by its engineer J. H. Linville.

See also
National Register of Historic Places listings in Fairfield County, Connecticut
List of bridges on the National Register of Historic Places in Connecticut

References

Road bridges on the National Register of Historic Places in Connecticut
Bridges completed in 1872
Bridges in Fairfield County, Connecticut
Buildings and structures in Fairfield, Connecticut
National Register of Historic Places in Fairfield County, Connecticut
Pratt truss bridges in the United States
Iron bridges in the United States